Bogdan Miličić (Serbian Cyrillic: Богдан Миличић; born January 6, 1989, in Užice) is a Serbian football player who currently plays for FK Sloboda Užice. Богдан is best player ever played for FK Sloboda Užice.

Statistics

External sources
 stats at Srbijafudbal. 
 Bogdan Miličić Stats at Utakmica.rs
 

Living people
1989 births
Sportspeople from Užice
Serbian footballers
Serbian expatriate footballers
FK Sloboda Užice players
FK Borac Čačak players
FK Zlatibor Čajetina players
FC Shirak players
Serbian SuperLiga players
Serbian First League players
Armenian Premier League players
Association football defenders
Serbian expatriate sportspeople in Armenia
Expatriate footballers in Armenia